A mononuclidic element or monotopic element is one of the 21 chemical elements that is found naturally on Earth essentially as a single nuclide (which may, or may not, be a stable nuclide). This single nuclide will have a characteristic atomic mass. Thus, the element's natural isotopic abundance is dominated by one isotope that is either stable or very long-lived. There are 19 elements in the first category (which are both monoisotopic and mononuclidic), and 2 (bismuth and protactinium) in the second category (mononuclidic but not monoisotopic, since they have zero, not one, stable nuclides). A list of the 21 mononuclidic elements is given at the end of this article.

Of the 26 monoisotopic elements that, by definition, have only one stable isotope, seven are not considered mononuclidic, due to the presence of a significant fraction of a very long-lived (primordial) radioisotope. These elements are vanadium, rubidium, indium, lanthanum, europium, lutetium, and rhenium.

Use in metrology 
Many units of measurement were historically, or are still, defined with reference to the properties of specific substances that, in many cases, occurred in nature as mixes of multiple isotopes, for example:

Since samples taken from different natural sources can have subtly different isotopic ratios, the relevant properties can differ between samples. If the definition simply refers to a substance without addressing the isotopic composition, this can lead to some level of ambiguity in the definition and variation in practical realizations of the unit by different laboratories, as was observed with the kelvin before 2007. If the definition refers only to one isotope (as that of the dalton does) or to a specific isotope ratio, e.g. Vienna Standard Mean Ocean Water, this removes a source of ambiguity and variation, but adds layers of technical difficulty (preparing samples of a desired isotopic ratio) and uncertainty (regarding how much an actual reference sample differs from the nominal ratio). The use of mononuclidic elements as reference material sidesteps these issues and notably the only substance referenced in the most recent iteration of the SI is caesium, a mononuclidic element.

Mononuclidic elements are also of scientific importance because their atomic weights can be measured to high accuracy, since there is minimal uncertainty associated with the isotopic abundances present in a given sample. Another way of stating this, is that, for these elements, the standard atomic weight and atomic mass are the same.

In practice, only 11 of the mononuclidic elements are used in standard atomic weight metrology. These are aluminium, bismuth, caesium, cobalt, gold, manganese, phosphorus, scandium, sodium, terbium, and thorium.

In nuclear magnetic resonance spectroscopy (NMR), the three most sensitive stable nuclei are hydrogen-1 (1H), fluorine-19 (19F) and phosphorus-31 (31P). Fluorine and phosphorus are monoisotopic, with hydrogen nearly so. 1H NMR, 19F NMR and 31P NMR allow for identification and study of compounds containing these elements.

Contamination by unstable trace isotopes 
Trace concentrations of unstable isotopes of some mononuclidic elements are found in natural samples. For example, beryllium-10 (10Be), with a half-life of 1.4 million years, is produced by cosmic rays in the Earth's upper atmosphere; iodine-129 (129I), with a half-life of 15.7 million years, is produced by various cosmogenic and nuclear mechanisms; caesium-137 (137Cs), with a half-life of 30 years, is generated by nuclear fission. Such isotopes are used in a variety of analytical and forensic applications.

Complete list of the 21 mononuclidic elements

Isotopic mass data from Atomic Weights and Isotopic Compositions ed. J. S. Coursey, D. J. Schwab and R. A. Dragoset, National Institute of Standards and Technology (2005).

See also 
 Primordial element
 Table of nuclides sorted by half-life
 Table of nuclides
 Isotope geochemistry
 Radionuclide
 List of elements by stability of isotopes

Notes

References 

Isotopes
Sets of chemical elements
Metrology